Pelangi Airways Sdn Bhd (doing business as Pelangi Airways) was a regional airline of Malaysia based at Kuala Lumpur Subang Airport. The airline covered secondary routes within Peninsular Malaysia and international flights to Sumatra in Indonesia, Thailand and Singapore.

History 
Pelangi Air was incorporated in 1987 to service the domestic sector and international destinations. They ceased operation in late 2001 following the take over of international route to Singapore by Berjaya Air. After ceasing operation, their aircraft were abandoned at Subang Airport, Selangor and Senai International Airport, Johor.

Fleet 

Before Pelangi Air ceased its operation in 2001, the carrier fleet consisted of:
 3 Fairchild Dornier 228
 2 Fokker 50

Pelangi Air started services using De Havilland DHC-6 Twin Otter and Fairchild Dornier Do-228 aircraft.  Pelangi Air leased 2 Fokker 50 from Malaysia Airlines during 1994 until 1997 before returning them back to Malaysia Airlines. The airline ordered the Dash 8-300, but cancelled the order before delivery in 1997, but one Dash 8 was already painted in Pelangi Air colours.

Former Destinations 
 Indonesia
 Banda Aceh (Sultan Iskandarmuda Airport)
 Medan (Polonia International Airport)
 Padang (Tabing Airport)
 Palembang (Sultan Mahmud Badaruddin II Airport)
 Pekanbaru (Sultan Syarif Kasim II International Airport)
 Malaysia
 Alor Star (Sultan Abdul Halim Airport)
 Ipoh (Sultan Azlan Shah Airport)
 Johor Bahru (Senai International Airport)
 Kerteh (Kerteh Airport)
 Kota Bharu (Sultan Ismail Petra Airport)
 Kuala Lumpur (Sultan Abdul Aziz Shah Airport)
 Kuala Terengganu (Sultan Mahmud Airport)
 Kuantan (Sultan Haji Ahmad Shah Airport)
 Langkawi (Langkawi International Airport)
 Malacca (Batu Berendam Airport)
 Pangkor (Pangkor Airport)
 Penang (Bayan Lepas International Airport)
 Tioman (Tioman Airport)
 Singapore
 Singapore (Seletar Airport)
 Thailand
 Ko Samui (Samui Airport)
 Phuket (Phuket International Airport)

Pelangi Air ordered some De Havilland Canada Dash 8 in 1997 which were never delivered.

They used to wet-lease a 737-200 passenger configurations from Transmile Air Services and wear Aero Asia livery to fly some domestic route for a short period in 2000. The same 737-200 from Transmile Air Services is also used to service regional airline or charters in Malaysia by an operator for a short while.

References

1987 establishments in Malaysia
2001 disestablishments in Malaysia
Defunct airlines of Malaysia
Airlines established in 1987
Airlines disestablished in 2001